The 2007 English cricket season was the 108th in which the County Championship had been an official competition. It began on Saturday 14 April 2007 with the match between MCC and the 2006 county champions Sussex at Lord's. Sussex went on to win the County Championship.

The West Indies toured England to compete in the Wisden Trophy test series which England won 3-0 and India defeated England 1–0 in the Pataudi Trophy.

Roll of honour
Test series
England v West Indies: 4 Tests – England won 3–0.
England v India: 3 Tests – India won 1–0.
ODI series
England v West Indies: 3 ODI's – West Indies won 2–1.
England v India: 7 ODI's – England won 4–3.
Twenty20 Internationals
England v West Indies: 2-match series tied 1–1.
County Championship
Champions: Sussex
Division Two winners: Somerset
Friends Provident Trophy
Winners: Durham – Runners-up: Hampshire
Pro40 (National League)
Division One winners: Worcestershire
Division Two winners: Durham
Twenty20 Cup
Winners: Kent – Runners-up: Gloucestershire
Minor Counties Championship
Winners: Cheshire – Runners-up: Northumberland
MCCA Knockout Trophy
Winners: Suffolk – Runners-up: Cheshire
Second XI Championship
Winners: Sussex
Second XI Trophy
Winners: Middlesex 2nd XI – Runners-up: Somerset 2nd XI
Middlesex won by 1 run.
Wisden Cricketers of the Year
Ian Bell, Shivnarine Chanderpaul, Ottis Gibson, Ryan Sidebottom, Zaheer Khan

Test series

West Indies tour

India tour

Domestic competition tables

County Championship

Division One

Division Two

NatWest Pro40

Friends Provident Trophy

Twenty20 Cup

References

External links
 Cricinfo – England Domestic 2007

Annual reviews
 Playfair Cricket Annual 2008
 Wisden Cricketers' Almanack 2008

 
2007 in cricket
Cricket season
 2007